Roanoke Review is an American literary journal based at Roanoke College in Salem, Virginia.  It was founded in 1967 by Henry Taylor and Edward A. Tedeschi.  Among the journal's original contributors were Malcolm Cowley, Lee Smith, and R.H.W. Dillard.   Robert Walter edited the Review until 2001.  Paul Hanstedt took over the Review after Dr. Walter's retirement, and has edited it since.  Starting in 2015, the Review became a digital-only journal, featuring stories, poems, nonfiction essays, interviews, art, and podcasts.

Among the recent contributors are Ernest Kroll, June Spence, Charles Wright, Radoslav Rochallyi and Jacob M. Appel.

See also
List of literary magazines

References

External links
Roanoke Review Website

Literary magazines published in the United States
Bimonthly magazines published in the United States
Magazines established in 1967
Magazines published in Virginia
Roanoke College